Snapshots as Souvenirs is a 1976 Bulgarian drama film, by the director Rumen Surdzhiyski. The film was shot in Sofia, in the building of what is today the National Finance and Economics High School, located in "Lozenetz" quarter. Its first theatrical screening took place on 13 August, 1979.

The screenplay is based on the novel My First Summer, by Emil Manov.

Synopsis 
Snapshots as Souvenirs is a youth film, which depicts the inevitable tribulations and hurdles, through which the adolescents go through, in the complex school environment. Tribulations, which put to test concepts, such as friendship, honor and dignity. Tribulations, which will ever remain in the minds of each of us like snapshots – souvenirs for a lifetime.

Cast and crew 
Screenplay writer of the film is Atanas Tzenev. Cinematographer is Vyacheslav Anev. The production designer is Ivan Apostolov. The music of the film is composed by Bozhidar Petkov.

Cast overview:
 Elena Dimitrova – as Sashka
 Svetlana Atanasova – as Nikolina
 Mikhail Mikhaylov – as Mihail
 Iskra Genkova – as Roza
 Maya Vladigerovа  –  as the mother
 Rashko Mladenov – as Stanimir
 Slavka Slavova – as Mrs. Fileva – the literature teacher
 Stefan Iliev – as Todorov
 Yuriy Yakovlev – as Nikolina's father
 Maria Stefanova
 Atanas Bozhinov
 Lyuben Petrov
 Valentin Gadzhokov
 Boyka Velkova

Review

References

Sources 
 "Snimki za spomen" in Film titles, General index, vol. 6,page 23, 24, 59
 "Snimki za spomen" in Variety Film Reviews 1907–1980, vol. 16, page 230
 "Snimki za Spomen" as "Snapshots as Souvenirs" (1979) in "Keeping score: film music 1972-1979", pages 215, 295 – the composer Bozhidar Petkov
 "Snapshots as Souvenirs" as "СНИМКИ ЗА СПОМЕН" (1979) in cinema.bg
 "Снимки за спомен" as "Snapshots as Souvenirs" (1979) in "Bulgarian feature films: Annotated Illustrated Filmography 1971-1980", Vol. 3; Original title: "Български игрални филми: анотирана илюстрована филмография. 1971-1980", Том 3, page 308

External links 
 

Bulgarian drama films
1976 films